Anse Mamin (Mamin Bay) is bay on the coast with a small black sand beach in Soufrière District, Saint Lucia. It is located near Anse Chastanet and the two beaches are linked by a rocky path below the cliffs. Anse Mamin offers  of wooded trails.

Other nearby sites include:
Anse Mamin Bay, 
Anse Mamin River, 
The village of Mamin, 
Anse Mamin Estate,

References

Beaches of Saint Lucia
Bays of Saint Lucia